The Netherlands women's national football team represents the Netherlands in international women's football, and is directed by the Royal Dutch Football Association (KNVB), which is a member of UEFA and FIFA.

In 1971, the team played the first women's international football match recognized by FIFA against France. They played at the final tournament of the UEFA Women's Championship three times and were champions in 2017 as hosts. They qualified for the World Cup twice, reaching the final of the 2019 edition of the World Cup, losing 2–0 against the United States. The result of the 2019 World Cup meant that the Netherlands team qualified for 2020 Olympics where they lost in the quarter-finals.

The Netherlands was one of a number of European countries where women's football was banned for a long time, and received scepticism afterwards. The team has grown in popularity during and after their surprise victory on home soil at the 2017 Euro's. 

The nicknames for the team are Oranje (Orange) and Leeuwinnen (Lionesses). Andries Jonker has been head coach since the conclusion of the UEFA Women's Euro 2022. As of December 2022, the team is ranked number 8 in the FIFA Women's World Rankings.

History
On 17 April 1971, the Dutch team played the first women's international football match recognized by FIFA against France. The match took place in Hazebrouck, France and resulted in a 4–0 defeat for the Netherlands, Jocelyne Ratignier and Marie-Claire Caron-Harant scoring.

In 1980s and 1990s, the team failed to qualify for the final tournaments of UEFA's European Championship and later also for the FIFA's World Championship. The Royal Dutch Football Association began major investments into women's football in the 2000s, culminating in the establishment of the Women's Eredivisie in 2007 (which was merged with the Belgian league in 2012). This resulted in the team qualifying for a major tournament for the first time at the UEFA Women's Euro 2009. They finished in third place, together with Norway, behind second placed England and winners Germany (first place). The team again qualified for the UEFA Women's Euro 2013, but did not advance after the group stage.

The oranjes qualified for the 2015 FIFA Women's World Cup and reached thirteenth place, losing their first match in the knockout stage to Japan.

In 2017, the Netherlands won their first major women's trophy, ending Germany's seemingly unbeatable reign over the UEFA Women's Championship and surprising friend and foe alike by winning the tournament on home soil, beating Denmark 4–2 in the final. The successful campaign in which oranje managed to win all of their matches highly contributed to the popularity of women's football in the Netherlands.

In 2018, the Netherlands finished second in their UEFA Qualifying Group behind Norway. Therefore, they had to go through the UEFA play-off in order to qualify for the 2019 World Cup. Switzerland, Belgium and Denmark were the other teams in the play-off. The Netherlands beat Denmark 4–1 on aggregate in the play-off semi-finals and repeated that result against Switzerland over two legs in the play-off final to qualify. In the 2019 FIFA Women's World Cup, the Netherlands had another strong performance, reaching the final before losing 2–0 to the United States.

They qualified for the 2020 Summer Olympics thanks to their position at the 2019 World Cup where they finished among the 3 best European teams. The Netherlands passed the 1st round at their first Olympic participation, finishing at the top of their group thanks to 2 large victories (10–3 against Zambia and 8–2 against China) and a draw (3–3 against Brazil), displaying an attractive offensive game but a certain defensive frailty (8 goals conceded in the group stages). However, their journey ended in the quarter-finals against the United States, an opponent who had already played the role of tormentor of the Oranje in the final of the French World Cup two years earlier, losing in penalty kicks (2–2, 2 pts to 4). The Dutch will have regrets, Lieke Martens having missed a decisive penalty in the 81st minute of the game when the score was tied 2–2.

Succescoach Sarina Wiegman left the team after the Olympics and was replaced by Englishman Mark Parsons. The Netherlands reached UEFA Women's Euro 2022 in England with a perfect record of ten victories in qualification. In England the Netherlands passed the group stage thanks to two victories over Switzerland and Portugal. A draw against Sweden however meant the team had to face France in the quarterfinals. Although they only lost in extra time, they were thoroughly outplayed and it was decided to part ways with Parsons.

Andries Jonker took over coaching responsibilities and was immediately faced with a must win game versus Iceland if the netherlands wanted to avoid the play-offs for the 2023 World Cup. In a tense game Esmee Brugts scored the desperately needed goal only in stoppage time and the Netherlands qualified for their third World Cup.

Team image

Nicknames
The Netherlands women's national football team has been known or nicknamed as the "Oranje leeuwinnen" (Orange Lionesses).

FIFA world rankings

Overall official record
 All results list the Netherlands goal tally first.
 Goal scorers are sorted alphabetically.
 Colors gold, silver, and bronze indicate first-, second-, and third-place finishes.

Overall record 

note:a=Scotland withdrew during the 1989 qualification, their played results were voided.

Results and fixtures

The following is a list of matches in the last 12 months, as well as any future matches that have been scheduled.

Legend

2022

2023

Coaching staff

Technical staff

Head coaches

Coaches' records

 1. Includes 70 matches main coach (period 2017-2021), 1 match against Belarus - 8:0 as Interim coach (17.09.2015), 15 matches assistant coach (29.11.2015 - first match and 29.11.2016 - last match). Onsoranje.nl includes 8 matches from 15, coached Sarina by main coach instead assistaint, Therefore, it turns out 79 (70+1+8). Main coach - 70 matches + 1 match in 2015.

Players

Current squad
The following 26 players were named in the squad for friendly matches against Austria on 17 and 21 February 2023.

Caps and goals correct as of 21 February 2023, after the match against Austria.

Recent call-ups
The following players have also been called up to the squad in the past 12 months.

RET

INJ Injured 
WIT Withdrew from the squad 
RET Retired from the national team.

Records

, after the match against Austria.
Players in bold are still active, at least at club level.

Most caps

Most goals

Competitive record

FIFA Women's World Cup

On 27 November 2014, the Netherlands national football team qualified to the final tournament of the FIFA Women's World Cup for the first time. In 2019, they reached the Final and lost to the United States team.

Draws include knockout matches decided on penalty kicks.

Olympic Games

Since the inception of women's Olympic football, UEFA has designated the World Cup as its qualifying tournament for the succeeding Olympic tournament. Because the Netherlands failed to qualify to the World Cup until 2015, the Netherlands women automatically failed to qualify for the Olympics up to 2012. In 2015 Netherlands made it to their first World Cup. Their round of 16 exit was good enough for a post World Cup mini tournament to decide UEFA's last spot at the Olympics. Sweden won that tournament and the Netherlands were eliminated. In 2019 the Netherlands reached the World Cup final and qualified for the Olympics for the first time.

UEFA European Women's Championship

The Netherlands failed to qualify for the final tournament of the UEFA Women's Championship from 1984 to 2005. In 2009, the Netherlands women's team qualified and reached third place. In 2013, they qualified again, but did not advance after the group stage. The Netherlands women booked a major victory on the 2017 tournament: following a 4–2 victory over Denmark they became the new European champion. Furthermore, Lieke Martens was heralded as the best player of the tournament.

 * Draws include knockout matches decided on penalty kicks.
 ** Missing flag indicates no host country.

Head-to-head record
The table shows Netherlands all-time international record against all opponents.

updated till 12 Oktober 2022

See also
Sport in the Netherlands
Football in the Netherlands
Women's football in the Netherlands
Netherlands women's national under-19 football team
Netherlands women's national under-17 football team
Netherlands men's national football team

References

External links

 
FIFA profile

 
European women's national association football teams
UEFA Women's Championship-winning countries